Plaster spraying allows a plasterer to skim a drywall more than five times faster than using a hand float to apply it. Although classic gypsum-based plaster can be sprayed if it is "spray grade," most plaster sprayers prefer the organic-based pre-mixed plaster packaged in a plastic bag because the plaster spraying machine does not need to be cleaned out after the job is finished, providing that plaster is kept moist. The pre-mixed plaster also has the advantage that any surplus can be recycled, almost eliminating waste, and plasterers do not need to haul water and mix the plaster from powder. A drywall skimmed with pre-mixed plaster can be painted in less than 24 hours, depending on the ambient temperature and humidity.

Equipment 

Plaster sprayers are of four types:

Pneumatic Sprayer 
Most common and simple to use. These sprayers have a hopper which holds the material which is connected to an air compressor. The air moves through the bottom of the hopper forcing the plaster out via the outputs on the wall. These tools generally are easy to clean and cost between $250 – US$300.

Worm-drive pump 

These sprayers have a worm-drive pump like Utiform Quattro or Master that pumps the plaster up to a spray gun that has a large nozzle, usually 4 to 8 mm, that extrudes the plaster into a chamber on the end of the gun. In this chamber, compressed air is introduced to blast the plaster into a spray. Worm-drive pumps have a rubber stator which is not compatible with solvent-based materials.

Peristaltic pump 

There are a few plaster sprayers that have a peristaltic pump (a tube squeezed by rollers) which also requires compressed air to produce a spray. These types of plaster sprayer can also spray textured coatings with particle sizes up to about 3mm diameter, providing that they are not solvent based.

Piston pump 

Newer types of plaster sprayer have a piston pump, which has sufficient pressure to spray smooth (untextured) plaster without compressed air. Full airless pumps are sometimes used to spray smooth plaster, although they are not ideal as the flow rate is too low for volume projects; however, they can be used to spray solvent-based plasters.

These flow-rates are calculated at a maximum of  air supply. These pumps are material supply pumps only and additional air is required at the spray gun to propel the material to the surface. These guns are usually an internal mixture type guns where the material and air exits the gun together.

Finishing 

When the plaster has been sprayed on the wall or ceiling, it is laid off with a wide spatula, typically 40 cm wide. This can be mounted on a pole for finishing the ceiling.

References 

Plastering